Plymouth coach station is a terminus for intercity bus services located in Plymouth, England.

History 
Plans for the coach station were formally submitted to planners in January 2015. Construction on the coach station began in January 2016. It replaced Bretonside bus station on opening. It opened on 8 September 2016, following an opening ceremony the previous day.

Operation 
The coach station is operated by National Express. It has seven bays for coaches. Services from National Express, Megabus, and SW Falcon call at the station.

References 

Bus stations in England
Transport in Plymouth, Devon
2016 establishments in England
Buildings and structures in Plymouth, Devon